Kyekyekule is a kids' program that aired during the early 1990s, it was directed and produced by George Liang or Uncle George and team. This program was often aired on GTV.

References

Ghanaian television series
1990s Ghanaian television series
1990s children's television series
Ghana Broadcasting Corporation original programming